Maas is through its leading role in the IVA (International Vending Alliance) part of the largest vending machine operating network in the world. Its global head office is in Eindhoven, Netherlands.

Maas/IVA with an install base over 600,000 vending machines in operation worldwide is considered one of the largest companies in the industry. The company is organized in 4 regions, EMEA (Europe Middle-East and Africa), Asia Pacific, Latin America and North America

Next to the operations, Maas puts a lot of emphasis on development of new and innovative product lines. All this is done via its wholly owned subsidiary Spengler in Germany and China.

The Maas machines are distinguished by their universal design - black and silver, glass fronted machines all made to the same dimensions. Maas was originally established in 1890 as a cigar producer.

External links
Official Website

Vending
Coffee appliance vendors
Companies based in Eindhoven
Manufacturing companies of the Netherlands
Dutch brands